The List of space artifacts in the Smithsonian Institution includes space artifacts exhibited in the Smithsonian Institution's National Air and Space Museum, Steven F. Udvar-Hazy Center, and the Paul E. Garber Preservation, Restoration, and Storage Facility. The Smithsonian Institution's collection of space artifacts is the largest on display in the world.


Space artifacts displayed at the National Air and Space Museum
 Apollo 11 Command Module Columbia capsule
 Apollo-Soyuz Test Project replica
 Explorer 1 replica
 Mercury Friendship 7 capsule
 Gemini 7
 Hubble Space Telescope test article and backup mirror
 Pioneer H
 Skylab B
 Sputnik replica
 V-2 rocket
 Vanguard TV3

Large space artifacts displayed at the Steven F. Udvar-Hazy Center
Opened in 2003, the Steven F. Udvar-Hazy Center, located near Washington Dulles International Airport in Fairfax County, Virginia, features thousands of artifacts for which insufficient space could be found for display in the Museum's National Mall building. The James S. McDonnell Space Hangar, opened in 2004, is incorporated into the Udvar-Hazy Center.

 Advanced Orbiting Solar Observatory
 Aerobee Heliostat Nosecone, Infrared Telescope, and Instrument Rack
 Aerobee Nose Cone Shell
 Agena-B Upper Stage
 Airborne Infrared Telescope
 Alouette satellite
 Antisatellite Missile
 Apollo Boilerplate Command Module
 Applications Technology Satellite, ATS-1
 Ariane 4 Rocket Model
 Viking 5C rocket engine
 Ariel 1 satellite replica
 Atlas-Agena Launch Console
 Atlas-Centaur Rocket Model
 Atoll Missile
 BMW 109-558 Rocket Engine and Propellant Tanks
 Bat Missile
 Bell No. 2 Rocket Belt
 Blohm und Voss Bv 246B Hagelkorn
 Caltech Infrared Telescope
 Corona Film Return Capsule
 Corporal Missile
 Echo 1 Communications Satellite replica
 Explorer 1 satellite mock-up
 Explorer 6 satellite replica
 Explorer 7 satellite replica
 Explorer 8 satellite replica
 Explorer 10 satellite replica
 Explorer 12 satellite replica
 Explorer 17 satellite replica
 F-1 (rocket engine) engine
 F-23 Ramjet Research Vehicle
 Far Side Sounding Rocket
 Gargoyle Missile
 Gemini Paraglider Research Vehicle 1-A
 Gemini TTV-1 Paraglider Capsule
 Gemini 7 Spacecraft
 Goddard 1935 A-Series Rocket
 H-1 Rocket Engine
 H-I Rocket Model
 H-II Rocket Model
 Homing Overlay Experiment Test Vehicle
 Hs 117 Schmetterling Missile
 Hs 293 A-1 Missile
 Hs 298 Missile
 IDEX II work station
 IMP-A satellite
 International Ultraviolet Explorer control and display console
 John Glenn's training couch
 Jupiter S-3 Rocket Engine
 Katydid Drone
 LOFTI-I satellite
 Lark Missile
 Littrow Spectrograph
 Loki-Dart Sounding Rocket
 Loon Missile
 MIDAS Series III infrared sensor
 Manned Maneuvering Unit
 Mariner 10 replica
 Mars Pathfinder airbags and lander prototype
 Mars Sojourner rover model
 Mercury Capsule "Big Joe"
 Mercury Capsule 15B, Freedom 7 II
 Mighty Mouse Missile
 Mobile Quarantine Facility
 Navajo Rocket Engine
 New Horizons model
 Nike-Ajax Missile
 Nike-Cajun Sounding Rocket
 Pegasus-XL Launch Vehicle
 Pioneer 1 satellite
 Pioneer V satellite
 UGM-73 Poseidon C-3 missile
 Raytheon Standard Missile 3
 Redstone Missile
 Relay 1 Communications Satellite
 Saturn V Instrument Ring
 Sidewinder Missile
 Skeet (KDC-2)
 Snark Guidance System
 Space Shuttle Discovery
 Space Shuttle Main Engine
 Sparrow 2 Missile
 Spartan 201 Satellite
 Styx Missile
 Subroc Antisubmarine Missile
 Talos Missile
 Tiny Tim Missile
 Titan 1 Rocket Engine
 Tracking and Data Relay Satellite
 Univac 1232 Computer
 Vanguard 3 satellite
 Vanguard Lyman Alpha satellite
 Vanguard Magnetometer satellite
 Vega French balloon
 Vega Solar System Probe Bus and Landing Apparatus
 X-259 Antares II Rocket Motor
 XKD5G-1 Target Drone
 Zuni missile

Artifacts on loan
 Gemini spacecraft No. 2, the Gemini-B prototype and Gemini 2 mission capsule; on loan to the USAF

References

Smithsonian Association
Space